Elm Springs may refer to:

Elm Springs, Arkansas, a city
Elm Springs, South Dakota, an unincorporated community
Elm Springs (house), historic building in Tennessee